The Sale of Student Loans Act 2008 (c.10) is an Act of the Parliament of the United Kingdom. It was passed to authorise the sale of the government's student loan portfolio to the private sector in order to raise revenue by secondary legislation. The act only extends to England and Wales as Scottish education is an exclusive competency of the Scottish Government and the powers to make the required secondary legislation for Wales are vested in Welsh Ministers.

References

United Kingdom Acts of Parliament 2008